Gluttons for Punishment, released in 2005, is a double live album by the progressive rock band Spock's Beard. It was recorded during the band's Octane tour on March 18, 2005, at Colos-Saal in Aschaffenburg, Germany; March 20 at Z7 in Pratteln, Switzerland; and March 21 at Substage in Karlsruhe, Germany. It is the first live album released by Spock's Beard since the departure of the former frontman Neal Morse.

Track listing

Disc one 
"Intro" – 1:20
"The Ballet of the Impact" – 5:50
"I Wouldn't Let It Go" – 4:47
"Surfing Down the Avalanche" – 3:53
"She Is Everything" – 7:06
"Climbing Up That Hill" – 3:34
"Letting Go" – 1:20
"Of the Beauty of It All" – 4:56
"Harm's Way" – 11:17
"NWC" – 9:58

Tracks 1-8 are played in sequence and form A Flash Before My Eyes.

Disc two 
"At the End of the Day" – 16:33
"The Bottom Line" – 7:40
"Ryo's Solo" – 5:57
"Ghosts of Autumn" – 6:49
"As Long As We Ride" – 8:26
"The Light" – 19:07

Personnel
Nick D'Virgilio - lead vocals, guitar, drums, percussion
Ryo Okumoto - keyboards, vocals
Alan Morse - guitars, vocals
Dave Meros - bass guitar, vocals

Additional personnel
Jimmy Keegan - drums, percussion, vocals

References

Spock's Beard albums
2005 live albums
Inside Out Music live albums